André Falcon (28 November 1924 – 22 July 2009) was a French film actor. He appeared in more than one hundred films from 1954 to 2008.

Filmography

References

External links
 

1924 births
2009 deaths
Male actors from Lyon
French male film actors